Ali Seven (born 15 August 1954) is a Turkish journalist, columnist, and businessman.

He was born in Turhal as the fourth child of a family from Of, Trabzon. He completed his high school education at Kabataş Erkek Lisesi in Istanbul. Then, he continued on to receive his post-secondary education from Eskişehir Commercial Sciences Academy. Seven is the father of four sons and has 6 grandchildren. He is a member of Turkish Journalists' Association, Association of European Journalists as well as BJK.

Works 
In 1971, Seven started his journalistic activities at "Bab-ıali'de Sabah". He served as a reporter and directed the economy pages in the newspaper. Later, he directed the Sport Section at OrtaDoğu. He also served as the Editor-In-Chief of the newspaper. At newspapers Tercüman and "Haber", he again served as the Editor-In-Chief. In 1978, he started his job as the news editor at "Milliyet" but successfully moved on to become the Editor-In-Chief. For a brief time, he also worked at "Cumhuriyet". In 1981, Seven established "Yüce Yayımları" and is still the CEO.

Seven created Turkey's first magazine in the field of electronics with the name "Elo Eloktronik". This magazine continued on for years and published monthly. In June 1984, he created medical magazines for Turkey's medical doctors under the name "Literatür" and "Sempozyum". He also created the first monthly magazine in the field of family medicine named "PRN Aile Hekimliği" as well as "EMDD" which serves in the field of diabetics. In the field of psychiatry, he publishes "Literatür Sempozyum". In the following year, he started publishing monthly magazine called "Bigudi" aimed at hair designers. Seven also created "Beşiktaş Ekspres" which was the first weekly municipal newspaper and reached 65,000 circulation within the municipality.

Seven continues to publish several books in the field of medicine such as Merck Manual of Diagnosis and Therapy as well as monthly magazines through "Yüce Yayımları". In 2005, he was a columnist for various newspapers such as "Akşam" and "Evet". Seven is permanently accredited as a journalist and carrier of permanent Press Pass despite the fact that he is not an active journalist any more. He created "Şikayetim" in 2004, which is one of Turkey's leading website in consumer rights. Seven, for some time, did some business in the construction industry in İzmir, Istanbul and Antalya.

References

Living people
1954 births
Turkish businesspeople
Turkish journalists
People from Tokat